Earl Wesley Gardner, Jr. (born April 19, 1950 in New York City) is an American jazz trumpeter known for his stint in the house band on Saturday Night Live, a chair he held from 1985 until 2022.

In 1976, he joined The Thad Jones/Mel Lewis Orchestra. He has later joined Carla Bleys Big Band.

Discography
With Carla Bley
Looking for America (Watt, 2003)
Appearing Nightly (Watt, 2008)
With George Benson
Big Boss Band (Warner Bros., 1990)
With Angela Bofill
I Wanna Love Somebody (Jive, 1983)
With David Bowie
Never Let Me Down (EMI, 1987)
With David Byrne
Grown Backwards (Nonesuch, 2004)
With Casiopea
Sun Sun (Alfa, 1986)
Platinum (Polydor, 1987)
With Hank Crawford
Tight (Milestone, 1996)
With Robin Eubanks
Karma (JMT, 1991)
With Charlie Haden's Liberation Music Orchestra
Dream Keeper (Blue Note, 1990)
With Tom Harrell
Time's Mirror (RCA Victor, 1999)
With Joe Henderson
Big Band (Verve, 1997)  
With Dave Holland
What Goes Around (ECM, 2002)
With James Ingram
Never Felt So Good (Qwest, 1986)
With Branford Marsalis
I Heard You Twice the First Time (Sony, 1992)With John ScofieldUp All Night (Verve, 2003)
That's What I Say: John Scofield Plays the Music of Ray Charles (Verve, 2005)With Zoot Sims and the Benny Carter OrchestraPassion Flower: Zoot Sims Plays Duke Ellington (1979)With Bob StewartGoin' Home (JMT, 1989)With The Thad Jones/Mel Lewis OrchestraThad Jones/Mel Lewis Orchestra with Rhoda Scott (Barclay, 1976)
It Only Happens Every Time (EMI, 1977)
Live in Munich (Horizon/A&M, 1976)With Stanley TurrentineNightwings (Fantasy, 1977)With McCoy Tyner'''The Turning Point (Birdology, 1992)Journey'' (Birdology, 1993)

References

1950 births
Living people
Musicians from New York City
American jazz trumpeters
American male trumpeters
Jazz musicians from New York (state)
21st-century trumpeters
21st-century American male musicians
American male jazz musicians
Mingus Big Band members
Saturday Night Live Band members